Robert Jones (30 August 1875 – 21 September 1944) was a Welsh rugby union forward who played club rugby for Llwynypia and Cardiff and international rugby for Wales.

Rugby career
Jones made his first appearance for Wales while representing Rhondda club, Llwynypia. Llwynypia, although unfashionable had provided several players to the Wales international team over the previous five years. Jones gained his one and only international cap when he was selected for the final game of the 1901 Home Nations Championship, where he was brought into the pack as a temporary replacement for Jehoida Hodges. The match was played at Swansea's St. Helen's Ground against Ireland, and Jones took his place in the squad with fellow Llwynypia team-mates William Alexander and Willie Llewellyn. Despite the Welsh scoring less tries than Ireland, Wales captain Billy Bancroft ensured victory by converting both tries, whereas Ireland missed all three of theirs. The next season saw the return off Hodges, and Jones did not represent Wales again.

In his later career, Jones played for top flight Welsh club, Cardiff. As an officer in the Glamorgan Constabulary he also represented Glamorgan Police on the rugby field.

International matches played for Wales
Wales
  1901

Bibliography

References

1875 births
1944 deaths
Cardiff RFC players
Glamorgan Police RFC players
Llwynypia RFC players
Glamorgan Police officers
Rugby union players from Pontypridd
Rugby union forwards
Wales international rugby union players
Welsh police officers
Welsh rugby union players